1642 års tiggareordning (English: Beggar regulation of 1642) was a Swedish Poor Law which organized the public Poor relief in the Sweden. The regulations of the law, with some alterations, was in effect until the 1847 års fattigvårdförordning (Poor relief regulation of 1847).

In the middle ages, poor care in Sweden was traditionally handled through the rotegångsystem in the country side, and by the poor houses of the church in the cities, a system which was kept after the Swedish Reformation, though the responsibility was formally (though not in practice) transferred from the church to the civil authorities (as the church itself became owned by the state). 

The regulation of 1642 stated that the every parish were responsible for their own paupers. Every parish should have a poor house for old and sick people, and an orphanage for children, financed by the parish church collection. If such facilities did not exist in the parish (and in rural communities, they seldom did, except for the occasional backstuga), then the paupers should either be housed with the parishioners in accordance with the established traditional rotegångsystem, or be given a beggar permit, legal only in their own parish: all other forms of beggary were banned.

The 1642 regulation were given some complements and smaller alterations, but it remained as the ground for the poor care system in Sweden until the 1847 års fattigvårdförordning (Poor relief regulation of 1847).

See also
 Welfare in Sweden

References
 Elisabeth Engberg, I fattiga omständigheter. Fattigvårdens former och understödstagare i Skellefteå socken under 1800-talet. [In poor circumstances. Poor relief policy and paupers in Skellefteå parish, Sweden, in the nineteenth century] Umeå 2005, 368 pp. Monograph.

Social history of Sweden
1642 in law
Social law
1642 in Sweden